Empire State Building Murders is a 2008 French mockumentary film directed by William Karel and starring Ben Gazzara, Mickey Rooney, Kirk Douglas, Cyd Charisse, Richard Erdman, Anne Jeffreys, and Marsha Hunt. It is considered a spin of Dead Men Don't Wear Plaid (1982). The film is also Kirk Douglas’ last television appearance before his retirement and subsequent death.

Cast
 Ben Gazzara as Paulie Genovese
 Mickey Rooney as Mickey Silver
 Kirk Douglas as Jim Kovalski
 Cyd Charisse as Vicky Adams
 Richard Erdman as Eddie Walker
 Anne Jeffreys as Betty Clark
 Marsha Hunt as Norah Strinberg
 Sara Sumara as Penny Baxter
 Patrick Floersheim as Récitant / Narrator
 Lauren Bacall as Penny Baxter (archive footage)
 James Cagney as Tony (archive footage)
 Wolfgang Draeger as Narrator
 Van Heflin as Bobby (archive footage)
 Edward G. Robinson as Brassi (archive footage)
 Lizabeth Scott as Lisa (archive footage)
 Simone Simon as Audrey (archive footage)
 Lawrence Tierney as Rico (archive footage)
 Richard Widmark as Stan (archive footage)

References

External links
 
 
 

2000s mockumentary films
French mockumentary films
Films directed by William Karel
Canal+
Special Broadcasting Service
Yle
Films shot in New York City
Empire State Building in fiction
2008 comedy films
2008 films
2000s French films